The Cello Concerto No. 2, Opus 126, was written by Dmitri Shostakovich in the spring of 1966 in the Crimea. Like the first concerto, it was written for Mstislav Rostropovich, who gave the premiere in Moscow under Yevgeny Svetlanov on 25 September 1966 at the composer's 60th birthday concert. Sometimes the concerto is listed as being in the key of G, but the score gives no such indication.

Along with the Eleventh String Quartet, the Preface to the Complete Works, and the Seven Romances on Texts by Alexander Blok, the Second Cello Concerto signaled the beginning of Shostakovich's late style.

Composition

Like the Fourth Symphony and Ninth String Quartet before it and the Fifteenth Symphony after it, the Second Cello Concerto gave Shostakovich some problems in the compositional stages. The opening Largo, for example, was originally conceived to be the start of a new symphony. Shostakovich later abandoned this idea, however, and reworked this movement into its present form. The finale also gave the composer considerable trouble. He confessed to Rostropovich that he had a finale completely written out but decided it was weak, scrapped it, and replaced it with the one we know today. Shostakovich also allowed Rostropovich to make a few changes to the concerto's cadenzas.

Scoring
The concerto is scored for solo cello, one piccolo, one flute, two oboes, two clarinets (each doubling B and A), two bassoons, contrabassoon (doubling 3rd bassoon), two horns, timpani, slapstick, wood block, tom-tom, tambourine, snare drum, bass drum, xylophone, two harps (always in unison as indicated on the score), and strings.

The concerto lasts around 35 minutes and has three movements:

Structure

First movement 
The first movement begins with solo cello, later joined by cellos and basses in octaves, interrupted by the cadenza before the opening theme returns. It then builds up with a series of interjections by the xylophone. The exchanges continue until the cello leads the orchestra into a climax, which gives way to a cadenza restating the opening material, punctuated by bass drum thumps. The movement ends softly.

Second movement 
The second movement is based on a theme from an Odessa street song, Bubliki, kupitye, bubliki (Buy My Bread Rolls).

Third movement 
The finale begins with French horn fanfares, followed by a cello cadenza accompanied only by tambourine. The Allegretto then moves through lyric, march, and dance sections. It builds in intensity, rising with an exchange of cello bursts countered by the snare drum, eventually developing into a climax; first restating the fanfare theme, then reverting to a grotesque variation of the Odessa theme. The whip is cracked twice during the climax, then ending the tutti. The cello then revisits the dancelike statement from earlier in the movement. In the coda the cello sustains a D over a percussion motif, concluding with a solo sforzando.

Although the piece has a rather irregular structure, the themes are evenly distributed and played in equal measure. This relative equality of mention is drastically different from the aggressive repetition of the DSCH motif in the First Cello Concerto, and this characteristic proves to be an important aspect of Shostakovich's later period.

Recordings

Recordings of this work include the following:

Mstislav Rostropovich/Moscow Philharmonic Orchestra/David Oistrakh (12-Nov-1967) (Yedang Classics)
Mstislav Rostropovich/USSR Symphony Orchestra/Evgeny Svetlanov (EMI Classics)
Mstislav Rostropovich/BBC Symphony Orchestra/Colin Davis (BBC Legends; monophonic aircheck of the first Western performance)
Mstislav Rostropovich/Boston Symphony Orchestra/Seiji Ozawa (Deutsche Grammophon)
Heinrich Schiff/Bavarian Radio Symphony Orchestra/Maxim Shostakovich (Philips)
Mischa Maisky/London Symphony Orchestra/Michael Tilson Thomas (Deutsche Grammophon)
Maria Kliegel/Polish National Radio Symphony Orchestra/Antoni Wit (Naxos Records)
Truls Mørk/London Philharmonic Orchestra/Mariss Jansons (Virgin Classics)
Truls Mørk/Oslo Philharmonic Orchestra/Vasily Petrenko (Ondine)
Natalia Gutman/Royal Philharmonic Orchestra/Yuri Temirkanov (RCA/BMG)
Natalia Gutman/Moscow State Philharmony/Dmitri Kitayenko (Live Classics) (recorded November 1986)
Daniel Müller-Schott/Bavarian Radio Symphony/Yakov Kreizberg (Orfeo)
/Danish National Symphony Orchestra/Gianandrea Noseda (Chandos)
Peter Wispelwey//Jurgen Hempel (Channel Classics)
Frans Helmerson/State Symphony Capella of Russia Valery Polyansky (Chandos)
Kyril Rodin/Russian Philharmonic Orchestra/Konstantin Krimets (Arte Nova Classics)
Raphael Wallfisch/BBC Symphony Orchestra/Martyn Brabbins (Nimbus)
/Malmö Symphony Orchestra/James DePreist (BIS)
Jiri Barta/Prague Symphony Orchestra/Maxim Shostakovich (Supraphon) 
Rafał Kwiatkowski/Polish Radio Orchestra/Wojciech Rajski (Dux)
Alexander Ivashkin/Moscow Symphony Orchestra/Valeri Polyansky (Ode)
Jamie Walton/Philharmonia Orchestra/Alexander Briger (Signum Classics)
Jonathan Ayling/London Shostakovich Orchestra/Christopher Cox (Dunelm Records)
Viviane Spanoghe/Sofia Soloists Symphony Orchestra/Emil Tabakov (Talent)
Ivan Monighetti/Prague Radio Symphony Orchestra/Vladimir Valek (Le Chant du Monde) 
Arto Noras/Norwegian Radio Orchestra/Ari Rasilainen (Finlandia, Warner Apex) 
Lynn Harrell/Royal Liverpool Philharmonic Orchestra/Gerard Schwarz (Avie) 
Dimitri Maslennikov/NDR Symphony Orchestra/Christoph Eschenbach (Phoenix Edition)
Sol Gabetta/Münchner Philharmoniker/Marc Albrecht/(RCA/BMG)
Valentin Feigin and USSR State TV and Radio Symphony Orchestra under Maxim Shostakovich(Melodia/Eurodisc)
Peter Bruns and Berlin Symphony Orchestra under Claus Peter Flor(Eterna)
Alisa Weilerstein/Pablo Heras–Casado/Symphonieorchester des Bayerischen Rundfunks (Decca)
Gautier Capuçon/Mariinsky Orchestra/Valery Gergiev (Erato)
Marc Coppey/Polish National Radio Symphony Orchestra/Lawrence Foster (Audite)

References

Concertos by Dmitri Shostakovich
Shostakovich Cello Concerto No. 2
1966 compositions
Compositions in G major